Keanau Dennis Post (born September 4, 1992) is a Canadian basketball player for Taiwan Beer of the Super Basketball League. He played college basketball for Southwestern Illinois and Missouri.

High school career
Post began his high school career at Oak Bay High School where he played for head coach Josh Elsdon. He averaged 12.5 points in league action for Oak Bay and led his club to the 2009-10 AAA Regional Championship while being named tournament All-Star. For his last year of high school, he transferred to Westwind Academy.

College career
Post began his college career at Southwestern Illinois where he became one of the country's top junior college players as a sophomore after averaging 12.3 points and 8.3 rebounds and earning Second Team Junior College All-America. As a junior, he transferred to Missouri and as a senior he averaged 4.0 points and 3.6 rebounds in 29 games.

Professional career
After going undrafted in the 2015 NBA draft, Post signed with Raptors 905 on October 31, 2015, as an affiliate player. On November 14, he made his debut with the Raptors in an 83–80 loss to the Fort Wayne Mad Ants, recording six points and six rebounds in 19 minutes off the bench. On the 2015–16 season, he averaged 2.8 points, 2.4 rebounds  and 0.3 blocks in 36 games.

On October 23, 2016, Post signed with Al-Nasr of the Saudi Premier League.

On August 24, 2019, he has signed with Polpharma Starogard Gdański of the Polish Basketball League. 

On January 1, 2020, he has signed with Peja of the Kosovo Basketball Superleague. However, Post did not play a game with the team and instead joined Qatar Club. In five games, he averaged 13.4 points, 12.2 rebounds, 1.2 assists and 2.4 blocks per game. Post signed with Al Hala of the Bahraini Premier League on November 6.

In September 2021, Post joined REG BBC of the Rwandan NBL. He helped the team capture their second ever NBL championship.

On February 23, 2022 Post joined Taiwan Beer of the Super Basketball League.

Personal life
The son of a Jamaican father and a Canadian mother (Jazmynn Post), he grew up on the Caribbean beaches of Negril and Grenada, where he initially practiced swimming, running and playing soccer.

References

External links
Missouri bio
RealGM profile
Sports-Reference profile

1992 births
Living people
Basketball people from British Columbia
Canadian expatriate basketball people in the United States
Canadian expatriate basketball people in Saudi Arabia
Canadian men's basketball players
Centers (basketball)
Canadian expatriate basketball people in Rwanda
Canadian expatriate basketball people in Lebanon
KB Peja players
Missouri Tigers men's basketball players
Power forwards (basketball)
REG BBC players
Raptors 905 players
Southwestern Illinois College alumni
Sportspeople from Victoria, British Columbia
Sagesse SC basketball players
Taiwan Beer basketball players
Canadian expatriate basketball people in Taiwan
Super Basketball League imports
Canadian expatriate basketball people in Bahrain
Canadian expatriate basketball people in Japan
Canadian expatriate basketball people in Poland
Canadian expatriate basketball people in Qatar